The West Indies cricket team toured England in the 2000 cricket season. West Indies played five Tests against England - two in June and three in August - with a triangular One Day International (ODI) series involving Zimbabwe in July.

In June, West Indies won the 1st Test at Edgbaston convincingly, before England narrowly won the 2nd Test at Lord's, having bowled West Indies out for 54 in their second innings.

The ODI series, sponsored by NatWest, took place in July, with England, West Indies and Zimbabwe all playing each other three times, and the two best teams qualifying for the final. West Indies lost four of their six matches, including all three against Zimbabwe. England beat Zimbabwe in the final at Lord's, thus winning an ODI tournament for the first time in two years.

The Test series concluded in August. After the 3rd Test at Old Trafford was drawn, England won the 4th Test at Headingley inside two days, bowling West Indies out for 61 in their second innings. They then won the 5th Test at The Oval, thus securing their first series victory against West Indies for 31 years.

In all five Tests and the ODI series, West Indies were captained by Jimmy Adams. Nasser Hussain captained England in the 1st Test before breaking a thumb while playing for Essex; Alec Stewart deputised in the 2nd Test and for much of the ODI series before Hussain returned.

The ball dominated the bat for most of the Test series, with a bowler taking five wickets in an innings on seven occasions (Courtney Walsh twice for West Indies, Andrew Caddick and Craig White twice each and Darren Gough once for England), but only three batsmen scoring centuries (Stewart and Brian Lara in the drawn 3rd Test, and Michael Atherton in the 5th). A hallmark of the series was the inconsistency of the West Indies batting: the team passed 300 runs only twice, and were twice dismissed in the second innings for less than 70 runs. England only passed 300 once, in the 3rd Test, but consistently recorded scores between 150 and 300.

Atherton scored the most runs for either team (311), while Marcus Trescothick, who made his Test debut in the 3rd Test, headed the batting averages with 47.50. Sherwin Campbell scored the most runs for West Indies (270), while Ramnaresh Sarwan had the team's best batting average (40.75).

Walsh took the most wickets for either team (34), thus becoming the first winner of the Malcolm Marshall Memorial Trophy; he was also named West Indies' player of the series. Gough took the most wickets for England (25), and was his team's player of the series. While Gough was well supported by Caddick (22) and Dominic Cork (20), Walsh took twice as many wickets as his long-time partner Curtly Ambrose (17), who retired from cricket after the 5th Test.

Test series

1st Test

2nd Test

The second day saw a part of all four innings: the final ball of West Indies' first innings, the entire England first innings and the entire West Indies second innings, and the first seven balls of England's second innings.
Matthew Hoggard (Eng) made his Test debut.

3rd Test

4th Test

Curtly Ambrose took his 400th Test wicket during England's innings.

5th Test

Notes

References
 Playfair Cricket Annual
 Wisden Cricketers Almanack (annual)

External sources
2000 tours from CricketArchive
Test series from Cricinfo
ODI series from Cricinfo
Test statistics from Cricinfo

2000 in English cricket
2000
International cricket competitions from 1997–98 to 2000
2000 in West Indian cricket